Polaris is a star in the northern circumpolar constellation of Ursa Minor. It is designated α Ursae Minoris (Latinized to Alpha Ursae Minoris) and is commonly called the North Star or Pole Star. With an apparent magnitude that fluctuates around 1.98, it is the brightest star in the constellation and is readily visible to the naked eye at night. The position of the star lies less than 1° away from the north celestial pole, making it the current northern pole star. The stable position of the star in the Northern Sky makes it useful for navigation.

As the closest Cepheid variable its distance is used as part of the cosmic distance ladder. Calculations by other methods vary widely.

Although appearing to the naked eye as a single point of light, Polaris is a triple star system, composed of the primary, a yellow supergiant designated Polaris Aa, in orbit with a smaller companion, Polaris Ab; the pair is in a wider orbit with Polaris B. The outer pair AB were discovered in August 1779 by William Herschel, where the 'A' refers to what is now known to be the Aa/Ab pair.

Stellar system

Polaris Aa is an evolved yellow supergiant of spectral type F7Ib with 5.4 solar masses. It is the first classical Cepheid to have a mass determined from its orbit. Polaris B can be resolved with a modest telescope. William Herschel discovered the star in August 1779 using a reflecting telescope of his own, one of the best telescopes of the time. In January 2006, NASA released images, from the Hubble telescope, that showed the three members of the Polaris ternary system.

The variable radial velocity of Polaris A was reported by W. W. Campbell in 1899, which suggested this star is a binary system. Since Polaris A is a known cepheid variable, J. H. Moore in 1927 demonstrated that the changes in velocity along the line of sight were due to a combination of the four-day pulsation period combined with a much longer orbital period and a large eccentricity of around 0.6. Moore published preliminary orbital elements of the system in 1929, giving an orbital period of about 29.7 years with an eccentricity of 0.63. This period was confirmed by proper motion studies performed by B. P. Gerasimovič in 1939.

As part of her doctoral thesis, in 1955 E. Roemer used radial velocity data to derive an orbital period of 30.46 y for the Polaris A system, with an eccentricity of 0.64.

There were once thought to be two more widely separated components—Polaris C and Polaris D—but these have been shown not to be physically associated with the Polaris system.

Observation

Variability

Polaris Aa, the supergiant primary component, is a low-amplitude Population I classical Cepheid variable, although it was once thought to be a type II Cepheid due to its high galactic latitude. Cepheids constitute an important standard candle for determining distance, so Polaris, as the closest such star, is heavily studied. The variability of Polaris had been suspected since 1852; this variation was confirmed by Ejnar Hertzsprung in 1911.

The range of brightness of Polaris is given as 1.86–2.13, but the amplitude has changed since discovery. Prior to 1963, the amplitude was over 0.1 magnitude and was very gradually decreasing. After 1966, it very rapidly decreased until it was less than 0.05 magnitude; since then, it has erratically varied near that range. It has been reported that the amplitude is now increasing again, a reversal not seen in any other Cepheid.

The period, roughly 4 days, has also changed over time. It has steadily increased by around 4.5 seconds per year except for a hiatus in 1963–1965. This was originally thought to be due to secular redward (lower temperature) evolution across the Cepheid instability strip, but it may be due to interference between the primary and the first-overtone pulsation modes. Authors disagree on whether Polaris is a fundamental or first-overtone pulsator and on whether it is crossing the instability strip for the first time or not.

The temperature of Polaris varies by only a small amount during its pulsations, but the amount of this variation is variable and unpredictable. The erratic changes of temperature and the amplitude of temperature changes during each cycle, from less than 50 K to at least 170 K, may be related to the orbit with Polaris Ab.

Research reported in Science suggests that Polaris is 2.5 times brighter today than when Ptolemy observed it, changing from third to second magnitude. Astronomer Edward Guinan considers this to be a remarkable change and is on record as saying that "if they are real, these changes are 100 times larger than [those] predicted by current theories of stellar evolution".

Role as pole star

Because Polaris lies nearly in a direct line with the Earth's rotational axis "above" the North Pole—the north celestial pole—Polaris stands almost motionless in the sky, and all the stars of the northern sky appear to rotate around it. Therefore, it makes an excellent fixed point from which to draw measurements for celestial navigation and for astrometry. The elevation of the star above the horizon gives the approximate latitude of the observer.

In 2018 Polaris was 0.66° away from the pole of rotation (1.4 times the Moon disc) and so revolves around the pole in a small circle 1.3° in diameter. It will be closest to the pole (about 0.45 degree) soon after the year 2100. Because it is so close to the celestial north pole, its right ascension is changing rapidly due to the precession of Earth's axis, going from 2.5h in AD 2000 to 6h in AD 2100. Twice in each sidereal day Polaris' azimuth is true north; the rest of the time it is displaced eastward or westward, and the bearing must be corrected using tables or a rule of thumb. The best approximation is made using the leading edge of the "Big Dipper" asterism in the constellation Ursa Major. The leading edge (defined by the stars Dubhe and Merak) is referenced to a clock face, and the true azimuth of Polaris worked out for different latitudes.

The apparent motion of Polaris towards and, in the future, away from the celestial pole, is due to the precession of the equinoxes. The celestial pole will move away from α UMi after the 21st century, passing close by Gamma Cephei by about the 41st century, moving towards Deneb by about the 91st century.

The celestial pole was close to Thuban around 2750 BC, and
It was about the same angular distance from β UMi as to α UMi by the end of late antiquity. The Greek navigator Pytheas in ca. 320 BC described the celestial pole as devoid of stars. However, as one of the brighter stars close to the celestial pole, Polaris was used for navigation at least from late antiquity, and described as ἀεί φανής (aei phanēs) "always visible" by Stobaeus (5th century), and it could reasonably be described as stella polaris from about the High Middle Ages. On his first trans-Atlantic voyage in 1492, Christopher Columbus had to correct for the "circle described by the pole star about the pole". In Shakespeare's play Julius Caesar, written around 1599, Caesar describes himself as being "as constant as the northern star", though in Caesar's time there was no constant northern star.

Polaris was referenced in Nathaniel Bowditch's 1802 book, American Practical Navigator, where it is listed as one of the navigational stars.

Names

The modern name Polaris is shortened from New Latin stella polaris "polar star", coined in the Renaissance when the star had approached the celestial pole to within a few degrees. 
Gemma Frisius, writing in 1547, referred to it as stella illa quae polaris dicitur ("that star which is called 'polar'"), placing it 3° 8' from the celestial pole.

In 2016, the International Astronomical Union organized a Working Group on Star Names (WGSN) to catalog and standardize proper names for stars. The WGSN's first bulletin of July 2016 included a table of the first two batches of names approved by the WGSN; which included Polaris for the star α Ursae Minoris Aa.

In antiquity, Polaris was not yet the closest naked-eye star to the celestial pole, and the entire constellation of Ursa Minor was used for navigation rather than any single star. Polaris moved close enough to the pole to be the closest naked-eye star, even though still at a distance of several degrees, in the early medieval period, and numerous names referring to this characteristic as polar star have been in use since the medieval period. In Old English, it was known as scip-steorra ("ship-star"){{cn}} ; 
In the Old English rune poem, the T-rune is apparently associated with "a circumpolar constellation", or the planet Mars.

In the Hindu Puranas, it became personified under the name Dhruva ("immovable, fixed"). In the later medieval period, it became associated with the Marian title of Stella Maris "Star of the Sea" (so in Bartholomeus Anglicus, c. 1270s)
An older English name, attested since the 14th century, is lodestar "guiding star", cognate with the Old Norse leiðarstjarna, Middle High German leitsterne.

The ancient name of the constellation Ursa Minor, Cynosura (from the Greek  "the dog's tail"), became associated with the pole star in particular by the early modern period.  An explicit identification of Mary as stella maris with the polar star (Stella Polaris), as well as the use of Cynosura as a name of the star, is evident in the title Cynosura seu Mariana Stella Polaris (i.e. "Cynosure, or the Marian Polar Star"), a collection of Marian poetry published by Nicolaus Lucensis (Niccolo Barsotti de Lucca) in 1655. 

Its name in traditional pre-Islamic Arab astronomy was al-Judayy الجدي ("the kid", in the sense of a juvenile goat ["le Chevreau"] in Description des Etoiles fixes), and that name was used in medieval Islamic astronomy as well. In those times, it was not yet as close to the north celestial pole as it is now, and used to rotate around the pole.

It was invoked as a symbol of steadfastness in poetry, as "steadfast star" by Spenser.
Shakespeare's sonnet 116 is an example of the symbolism of the north star as a guiding principle: "[Love] is the star to every wandering bark / Whose worth's unknown, although his height be taken." In Julius Caesar, he has Caesar explain his refusal to grant a pardon by saying, "I am as constant as the northern star/Of whose true-fixed and resting quality/There is no fellow in the firmament./The skies are painted with unnumbered sparks,/They are all fire and every one doth shine,/But there's but one in all doth hold his place;/So in the world" (III, i, 65–71). Of course, Polaris will not "constantly" remain as the north star due to precession, but this is only noticeable over centuries.

In Inuit astronomy, Polaris is known as Niqirtsuituq. It is depicted on the flag and coat of arms of the Canadian Inuit territory of Nunavut, as well as on the flag of the U.S. state of Alaska.

In traditional Lakota star knowledge, Polaris is named "Wičháȟpi owáŋžila". This translates to "The Star that Sits Still". This name comes from a Lakota story in which he married Tapun San Win "Red Cheeked Woman". However she fell from the heavens, and in his grief he stared down from "waŋkátu" (the above land) forever.

The Plains Cree call the star in Nehiyawewin: acâhkos êkâ kâ-âhcît "the star that does not move". In Mi'kmawi'simk the star is named Tatapn.

Distance

Many recent papers calculate the distance to Polaris at about 433 light-years (133 parsecs), based on parallax measurements from the Hipparcos astrometry satellite. Older distance estimates were often slightly less, and research based on high resolution spectral analysis suggests it may be up to 110 light years closer (323 ly/99 pc). Polaris is the closest Cepheid variable to Earth so its physical parameters are of critical importance to the whole astronomical distance scale. It is also the only one with a dynamically measured mass.

The Hipparcos spacecraft used stellar parallax to take measurements from 1989 and 1993 with the accuracy of 0.97 milliarcseconds  (970 microarcseconds), and it obtained accurate measurements for stellar distances up to 1,000 pc away. The Hipparcos data was examined again with more advanced error correction and statistical techniques. Despite the advantages of Hipparcos astrometry, the uncertainty in its Polaris data has been pointed out and some researchers have questioned the accuracy of Hipparcos when measuring binary Cepheids like Polaris. The Hipparcos reduction specifically for Polaris has been re-examined and reaffirmed but there is still not widespread agreement about the distance.

The next major step in high precision parallax measurements comes from Gaia, a space astrometry mission launched in 2013 and intended to measure stellar parallax to within 25 microarcseconds (μas). Although it was originally planned to limit Gaia's observations to stars fainter than magnitude 5.7, tests carried out during the commissioning phase indicated that Gaia could autonomously identify stars as bright as magnitude 3. When Gaia entered regular scientific operations in July 2014, it was configured to routinely process stars in the magnitude range 3 – 20. Beyond that limit, special procedures are used to download raw scanning data for the remaining 230 stars brighter than magnitude 3; methods to reduce and analyse these data are being developed; and it is expected that there will be "complete sky coverage at the bright end" with standard errors of "a few dozen µas". Gaia Data Release 2 does not include a parallax for Polaris, but a distance inferred from it is  (445.5 ly) for Polaris B, somewhat further than most previous estimates and several times more accurate. This was further improved to  (447.6 ly), upon publication of the Gaia Data Release 3 catalog on 13 June 2022 which superseded Gaia Data Release 2.

Gallery

See also
 Extraterrestrial sky (for the pole stars of other celestial bodies)
 Polar alignment
 Polaris Australis
 Polaris Flare
 Regiment of the North Pole

References

F-type supergiants
F-type main-sequence stars
Classical Cepheid variables
Triple star systems

Northern pole stars
 
Ursa Minor (constellation)
Ursae Minoris, Alpha
Durchmusterung objects
Ursae Minoris, 01
008890
011767
0424
Stars with proper names
Suspected variables